The 2012 IIHF Women's Challenge Cup of Asia was the third IIHF Women's Challenge Cup of Asia, an annual international ice hockey tournament held by the International Ice Hockey Federation (IIHF). It was held from 15 February 2012 to 19 February 2012 in Qiqihar, China. Japan won the tournament for the second year in a row after defeating China's first team in the gold medal game. China's second team won bronze after defeating South Korea in the third place match.

Overview
The 2012 IIHF Women's Challenge Cup of Asia began on 15 February 2012 in Qiqihar, China. The tournament expanded back to four teams from three in 2011 with the inclusion of a second Chinese national team. That second national team was the Chinese junior team. The opening game was played between the first and second teams of China with the first Chinese team defeating the second team 12–0. Japan won the tournament for the second year in a row after defeating China's first team in the gold medal game. China's second team finished in third place after defeating South Korea in the bronze medal game 2–1. Chiho Osawa of Japan finished the tournament as the top scorer after finishing with seven points including four goals and three assists. South Korea's Shin Sojung finished as the tournaments top goaltender based on save percentage with 93.33.

Round robin
The four participating teams were placed in a single round robin. After playing the round-robin, the top two teams advanced to the gold medal game while teams rank three and four advanced to the bronze medal game.All times local.

Gold medal game

Bronze medal game

Scoring leaders
List shows the top ten skaters sorted by points, then goals, assists, and the lower penalties in minutes.

Leading goaltenders

Only the top goaltenders, based on save percentage, who have played at least 40% of their team's minutes are included in this list.

References

External links
International Ice Hockey Federation

IIHF Women's Challenge Cup of Asia
Asia
2012
2012
Women